The Patera Building prototype, a significant example of British high-tech architecture, was manufactured in Stoke-on-Trent in 1982 by Patera Products Ltd. In 1980, Michael Hopkins architects (Principal Michael Hopkins, Project Architect John Pringle, now of Pringle Richards Sharratt) and Anthony Hunt Associates engineers (Principal Anthony Hunt and Project Engineer Mark Whitby now of Whitby Wood) were instructed by LIH (Properties) Ltd to design a relocatable building 216 square metres in size.
 
Longton Industrial Holdings Plc (LIH), an industrial group based in Stoke-on-Trent, Staffordshire, commissioned designs for an “off the peg” relocatable industrial building made from steel. They sought to expand their interests in steel fabrication, intending to sell the buildings as a product. The Patera Products Ltd factory where the Patera buildings were made and where the first two were erected was in Victoria Road, Fenton, Stoke-on-Trent, Staffordshire.

Clarification
This article traces the history of the prototype Patera Building completed in 1982 under the ownership and direction of Longton Industrial Holdings Plc through their wholly-owned subsidiary companies LIH (Properties) Ltd, and Patera Products Ltd. The article does not cover 'Patera Building System' (a later development of the Patera concept using several of the fabrication techniques such as the innovative panels, but with alternative traditional structural frames). The article does not cover the period during which the Patera concept was promoted under a trading name 'Patera Products' ('Patera Products' was an acquired name, unrelated to the original company Patera Products Ltd), nor during the period in which the Patera concept was promoted under the trading name of Patera Engineering Ltd (established 1988) also an acquired name. Patera Engineering Ltd did not manufacture any Patera Buildings.

History

The first prototype Patera Building was manufactured by Patera Products Ltd in 1982 by a workforce of experienced hands-on engineers and craftsmen drawn from industries in the area then in decline such as coal-mining. As almost every component was designed anew for the prototype, a high degree of accuracy was required as these prototype components formed a standard model to which future components were manufactured. The idea of the Patera project was to supply a factory finished industrial workshop. The buildings were standardised, 18m long by 12m wide, with an internal height of 3.85m throughout. They were fully finished in the factory ready for bolting together at the desired location. Three men with a forklift truck could erect one in a matter of days. It was seen in the context of vehicle or boatbuilding technologies in terms of its light weight construction. Each building needed a reinforced concrete raft slab as a base to which the structure was fixed using specially designed steel castings. All the buildings' services — power, telephone cabling, water, etc. — were distributed within the depth of the building envelope.

To support panels struck by automotive industry hydraulic presses, constituent parts of the Patera Building structure were pin-jointed for ease of handling and assembly. At the centres of the spans of the frames were unique 'tension-only' links — special fittings able to respond to varying structural loads. Under normal conditions the structure acted as a three-pin arch. In other conditions, such as wind up-lift, it acted as a rigid frame. This innovation meant that very slender lightweight steel tubes could be used for the portal frame trusses. The 'Patera Building Stoke-on-Trent for Longton Industrial Holdings (Properties) Ltd' received a commendation in the British Constructional Steelwork Association's Structural Steel Design Awards 1983, sponsored by the British Steel Corporation and the British Constructional Steelwork Association Ltd. The Judges' Comments: 'The creative thought that lies behind this design breaks new ground in the excellence of its parts and their skilful integration in the making of a architectural whole. It is a delight to see such innovation and care being applied to the production of precisely fabricated, economical, small buildings.'

Use of reclaimed land
The Berry Hill area of Stoke-on-Trent had a history of coal mining and brick-making. The Patera Building prototype was built on drained and reclaimed land there, circumstances that informed the design - requiring lightness of weight and raft foundations. In the 1960s visionary architect Cedric Price had proposed a Potteries Thinkbelt design which sought to make use of decommissioned railway routes following the Beeching Cuts and the scarred landscape of coal mining to provide linked learning centres for a technical industry-based curriculum. The first design studies for the Patera project in 1981 were for a managed industrial estate consisting of thirty or so standard Patera Buildings sited at the former Mossfield colliery in Longton Stoke-on-Trent.

Structural innovation by Anthony Hunt Associates

Anthony Hunt Associates devised an all-steel light weight structure, a hybrid three pin arch. Made in easily transportable component form, once assembled it offered significant advantages:
 The elimination of cross-bracing elements to the roof and wall trusses
 The use of panel assemblies as a diaphragm to prevent buckling of lower (innermost) truss boom during compression
 Introduction of a 'tension-only' link at midspan to prevent outer roof truss booms from buckling under compression
 Use of line bracing and secondary high tensile steel cross-bracing at the knee-joint position to prevent 'flipping' of structure under certain wind-loading
 Introduction of steel castings for ease of fabrication of pin joint connections
 Development of distinctive cast steel base plates to allow structural bolted connection to flat concrete slab base
 Wind loading analysis which allowed use anywhere within the UK mainland and climates where a similar pattern of wind speeds might prevail.

Innovation in manufacturing techniques
With steel panels pressed and factory finished rather than being cold-rolled, and with all components accurately sized and with their fixings prepositioned, the following advantages ensued:
 All components sized to fit efficiently within a standard 40 ft shipping container
 Ease of site assembly
 Interchangeable components within a single building or between others, allowed flexibility of layout and use
 Standard buildings made available ex stock
 Fully finished externally and internally
 Services such as power, water and communications routed within building shell

Commercial implementation
The Patera Building was launched in November 1981 at "Interbuild" a building exhibition at the National Exhibition Centre (NEC) Birmingham, with the wording: Patera Building A new concept in building design to provide efficient working units which combine good looks with engineering quality at sensible prices. 

The first two buildings were erected at the site adjacent to the Patera Products Ltd factory in Stoke-on-Trent where they stayed in place for some two years. They were used as demonstration buildings, part of the marketing of the project. Sites where other buildings were erected include Barrow-in-Furness, Canary Wharf and the Royal Docks in London. LIH Plc were proud to have hosted a Royal visit by Duke of Gloucester, an architect himself, during which he was shown around the workshops and the buildings.

1984-85: After the manufacturing company Patera Products Ltd was closed down, the two stock buildings, that is the prototype and another similarly sized building, were each extended from five bays to six and moved to London's Canary Wharf to be used as BT exhibition space provided by  London Docklands Development Corporation. Neighbours were the now demolished Limehouse TV Studios and the giant dishes of a satellite receiving station established for improved business communication. The site was on the late 1980s route of the London Marathon between, the fifteenth and sixteenth mile marks.
In 1989, to make way for the much heralded high rise commercial developed planned for Canary Wharf, Limehouse Studios was compulsorily purchased and demolished, and one of the two Patera Buildings (the original prototype) was moved to its third location on Albert Island. It was until recently used as a workshop on a boat repair yard and marina by Gallions Point Marina Ltd.

The Patera Building's future

Through a multi-agency initiative led by Twentieth Century Society, application was made to Historic England for the building to be listed. If the application had been successful, the Docklands Patera Building would have been carefully stabilised, conserved and moved once more to make way for development in the London Royal Docks Enterprise Zone. Interested parties associated with the listing process have accepted that the Docklands Patera Building is in fact the original 1982 prototype manufactured and first assembled in Stoke-on-Trent.  Dismantlement of the building in its Albert Island location started in Autumn 2021, but then for over a year, the building was left in a semi-dismantled state pending the decision, made in April 2022, not to list the building. Further, requests made to DCMS for a review of the Historic England decision were denied in October 2022 leaving the decision (not to list) to stand.

References

High-tech architecture
Prefabricated buildings
1980s architecture